Rebel in Paradise is a 1960 American documentary film on the artist Paul Gauguin produced by Robert D. Fraser, a San Francisco real estate developer. It was nominated for an Academy Award for Best Documentary Feature.

See also
 List of American films of 1960

References

External links

1960 films
American documentary films
1960 documentary films
Paul Gauguin
Documentary films about painters
1960s English-language films
1960s American films